Peach Orchard Hollow is a valley in McDonald County in the U.S. state of Missouri.

Peach Orchard Hollow was so named on account of peach orchards the valley once contained.

References

Valleys of McDonald County, Missouri
Valleys of Missouri